Jack Saunders may refer to:

 Jack Saunders (Australian cricketer) (1876–1927), Australian cricketer
 Jack Saunders (Middlesex cricketer), English cricketer
 Jack Saunders (English footballer), football centre half
 Jack Saunders (Australian footballer), Australian rules player
 Jack Saunders (presenter), TV and radio presenter